In mathematics, the Lambert  function, also called the omega function or product logarithm, is a multivalued function, namely the branches of the converse relation of the function , where  is any complex number and  is the exponential function.

holds if and only if

When dealing with real numbers only, the two branches  and  suffice: for real numbers  and  the equation

can be solved for  only if ; we get  if  and the two values  and  if .

The Lambert  relation cannot be expressed in terms of elementary functions. It is useful in combinatorics, for instance, in the enumeration of trees. In biochemistry, and in particular enzyme kinetics, an opened-form solution for the time-course kinetics analysis of Michaelis–Menten kinetics is described in terms of the Lambert  function.

Terminology
The Lambert  function is named after Johann Heinrich Lambert. The principal branch  is denoted  in the Digital Library of Mathematical Functions, and the branch  is denoted  there.

(Technical note: like the complex logarithm, it is multivalued and thus W is described as the converse relation rather than inverse function.)

History

The equation Lambert considered was 
 

Euler transformed this equation into the form
 

Both authors derived a series solution for their equations.

Once Euler had solved this equation, he considered the case . Taking limits, he derived the equation
 

He then put  and obtained a convergent series solution for the resulting equation, expressing x in terms of c.

In 1993, it was reported that the Lambert  function provides an exact solution to the quantum-mechanical double-well Dirac delta function model for equal charges—a fundamental problem in physics. Prompted by this, Rob Corless and developers of the Maple computer algebra system realized that "the Lambert W function has been widely used in many fields, but because of differing notation and the absence of a standard name, awareness of the function was not as high as it should have been."

Another example where this function is found is in Michaelis–Menten kinetics.

Although it was widely believed that the Lambert  function cannot be expressed in terms of elementary (Liouvillian) functions, the first published proof did not appear until 2008.

Elementary properties, branches and range

The functions  are all injective and their ranges are disjoint. The range of the entire multivalued function  is the complex plane.  The image of the real axis is the union of the real axis and the quadratrix of Hippias, the parametric curve .

Inverse 

The range plot above also delineates the regions in the complex plane where the simple inverse relationship  is true. f = zez implies that there exists an n such that , where n depends upon the value of z.

Defining , where x and y are real, and expressing ez in polar coordinates, it is seen that
 

 
and
 
 

Calculus

Derivative
By implicit differentiation, one can show that all branches of  satisfy the differential equation

As a consequence, we get the following formula for the derivative of W:

Using the identity , we get the following equivalent formula:

At the origin we have

Integral 
The function , and many other expressions involving , can be integrated using the substitution , i.e. :

(The last equation is more common in the literature but is undefined at ).  One consequence of this (using the fact that ) is the identity

Asymptotic expansions
The Taylor series of  around 0 can be found using the Lagrange inversion theorem and is given by

The function defined by this series can be extended to a holomorphic function defined on all complex numbers with a branch cut along the interval ; this holomorphic function defines the principal branch of the Lambert  function.

Keeping only the first two terms of the expansion,

Integer and complex powers
Integer powers of  also admit simple Taylor (or Laurent) series expansions at zero:

which is, in general, a Laurent series of order . Equivalently, the latter can be written in the form of a Taylor expansion of powers of :

Bounds and inequalities

A number of non-asymptotic bounds are known for the Lambert function.

Hoorfar and Hassani showed that the following bound holds for :

They also  showed the general bound

The bound allows many other bounds to be made, such as taking  which gives the bound

In 2013 it was proven that the branch  can be bounded as follows:

Roberto Iacono and John P. Boyd enhanced the bounds as following:

Identities

A few identities follow from the definition:

Note that, since  is not injective, it does not always hold that , much like with the inverse trigonometric functions.

Some other identities:

 
 
 
(which can be extended to other  and  if the correct branch is chosen).

Substituting  in the definition:

With Euler's iterated exponential :

Special values
The following are special values of the principal branch:

 (the omega constant).

Representations

The principal branch of the Lambert function can be represented by a proper integral, due to Poisson:

On the wider domain , the considerably simpler representation was found by Mező:

Another representation of the principal branch was found by the same author
and previously by Kalugin-Jeffrey-Corless:

The following continued fraction representation also holds for the principal branch:

Also, if :

In turn, if , then

Other formulas

Definite integrals
There are several useful definite integral formulas involving the principal branch of the  function, including the following:

The first identity can be found by writing the Gaussian integral in polar coordinates.

The second identity can be derived by making the substitution , which gives

Thus

The third identity may be derived from the second by making the substitution  and the first can also be derived from the third by the substitution .

Except for  along the branch cut  (where the integral does not converge), the principal branch of the Lambert  function can be computed by the following integral:

where the two integral expressions are equivalent due to the symmetry of the integrand.

Indefinite integrals

Applications

Solving equations
The Lambert  function is used to solve equations in which the unknown quantity occurs both in the base and in the exponent, or both inside and outside of a logarithm. The strategy is to convert such an equation into one of the form  and then to solve for  using the  function.

For example, the equation

(where  is an unknown real number) can be solved by rewriting it as

This last equation has the desired form and the solutions for real x are:

and thus:

Generally, the solution to

is:

where a, b, and c are complex constants, with b and c not equal to zero, and the W function is of any integer order.

Viscous flows
Granular and debris flow fronts and deposits, and the fronts of viscous fluids in natural events and in laboratory experiments can be described by using the Lambert–Euler omega function as follows:

where  is the debris flow height,  is the channel downstream position,  is the unified model parameter consisting of several physical and geometrical parameters of the flow, flow height and the hydraulic pressure gradient.

In pipe flow, the Lambert W function is part of the explicit formulation of the Colebrook equation for finding the Darcy friction factor. This factor is used to determine the pressure drop through a straight run of pipe when the flow is turbulent.

Time dependent flow in simple branch hydraulic systems 
The principal branch of the Lambert  function was employed in the field of mechanical engineering, in the study of time dependent transfer of Newtonian fluids between two reservoirs with varying free surface levels, using centrifugal pumps. The Lambert  function provided an exact solution to the flow rate of fluid in both the laminar and turbulent regimes: 

Neuroimaging 
The Lambert  function was employed in the field of neuroimaging for linking cerebral blood flow and oxygen consumption changes within a brain voxel, to the corresponding blood oxygenation level dependent (BOLD) signal.

Chemical engineering
The Lambert  function was employed in the field of chemical engineering for modelling the porous electrode film thickness in a glassy carbon based supercapacitor for electrochemical energy storage. The Lambert  function turned out to be the exact solution for a gas phase thermal activation process where growth of carbon film and combustion of the same film compete with each other.

Crystal growth
In the crystal growth, the distribution of solute can be obtained by using the Scheil equation. So the negative principal of the Lambert W-function can be used to calculate the distribution coefficient, :

Materials science
The Lambert  function was employed in the field of epitaxial film growth for the determination of the critical dislocation onset film thickness. This is the calculated thickness of an epitaxial film, where due to thermodynamic principles the film will develop crystallographic dislocations in order to minimise the elastic energy stored in the films. Prior to application of Lambert  for this problem, the critical thickness had to be determined via solving an implicit equation. Lambert  turns it in an explicit equation for analytical handling with ease.

Porous media
The Lambert  function has been employed in the field of fluid flow in porous media to model the tilt of an interface separating two gravitationally segregated fluids in a homogeneous tilted porous bed of constant dip and thickness where the heavier fluid, injected at the bottom end, displaces the lighter fluid that is produced at the same rate from the top end. The principal branch of the solution corresponds to stable displacements while the −1 branch applies if the displacement is unstable with the heavier fluid running underneath the lighter fluid.

Bernoulli numbers and Todd genus
The equation (linked with the generating functions of Bernoulli numbers and Todd genus):

can be solved by means of the two real branches  and :

This application shows that the branch difference of the  function can be employed in order to solve other transcendental equations.

Statistics
The centroid of a set of histograms defined with respect to the symmetrized Kullback–Leibler divergence (also called the Jeffreys divergence ) has a closed form using the Lambert  function.

Pooling of tests for infectious diseases
Solving for the optimal group size to pool tests so that at least one individual is infected involves the Lambert  function.

Exact solutions of the Schrödinger equation
The Lambert  function appears in a quantum-mechanical potential, which affords the fifth – next to those of the harmonic oscillator plus centrifugal, the Coulomb plus inverse square, the Morse, and the inverse square root potential – exact solution to the stationary one-dimensional Schrödinger equation in terms of the confluent hypergeometric functions. The potential is given as

A peculiarity of the solution is that each of the two fundamental solutions that compose the general solution of the Schrödinger equation is given by a combination of two confluent hypergeometric functions of an argument proportional to

The Lambert  function also appears in the exact solution for the bound state energy of the one dimensional Schrödinger equation with a Double Delta Potential.

Exact solution of QCD coupling constant
In Quantum Chromodynamics, the quantum field theory of the Strong interaction, the coupling constant  is computed perturbatively, the order n corresponding to Feynman diagrams including n quantum loops. The first order, n=1, solution is exact (at that the order) and analytical. At higher orders, n>1, there is no exact and analytical solution and one typically uses an iterative method to furnish an approximate solution. However, for second order, n=2, the Lambert function provides an exact (if non-analytical) solution.

Exact solutions of the Einstein vacuum equations
In the Schwarzschild metric solution of the Einstein vacuum equations, the  function is needed to go from the Eddington–Finkelstein coordinates to the Schwarzschild coordinates.  For this reason, it also appears in the construction of the Kruskal–Szekeres coordinates.

Resonances of the delta-shell potential
The s-wave resonances of the delta-shell potential can be written exactly in terms of the Lambert  function.

Thermodynamic equilibrium
If a reaction involves reactants and products having heat capacities that are constant with temperature then the equilibrium constant  obeys

(The upper solution may not be relevant.) If they have opposite signs, there will be one solution.

Phase separation of polymer mixtures
In the calculation of the phase diagram of thermodynamically incompatible polymer mixtures according to the Edmond-Ogston model, the solutions for binodal and tie-lines are formulated in terms of Lambert  functions.

Wien's displacement law in a D-dimensional universe
The solution  shows that the spectral energy density is dependent on the dimensionality of the universe.

AdS/CFT correspondence
The classical finite-size corrections to the dispersion relations of giant magnons, single spikes and GKP strings can be expressed in terms of the Lambert  function.

Epidemiology
In the  limit of the SIR model, the proportion of susceptible and recovered individuals has a solution in terms of the Lambert  function.

Determination of the time of flight of a projectile

The total time of the journey of a projectile which experiences air resistance proportional to its velocity can be determined in exact form by using the Lambert  function.

Electromagnetic surface wave propagation

The transcendental equation that appears in the determination of the propagation wave number of an electromagnetic axially symmetric surface wave (a low-attenuation single TM01 mode) propagating in a cylindrical metallic wire gives rise to an equation like  (where  and  clump together the geometrical and physical factors of the problem), which is solved by the Lambert  function. The first solution to this problem, due to Sommerfeld circa 1898, already contained an iterative method to determine the value of the Lambert  function.

Orthogonal trajectories of real ellipses

The orthogonal trajectories of this family are given by the differential equation  whose general solution is the family .

Generalizations
The standard Lambert  function expresses exact solutions to transcendental algebraic equations (in ) of the form:

The solution is

Generalizations of the Lambert  function include:

In this respect, the generalization resembles the hypergeometric function and the Meijer  function but it belongs to a different class of functions.
Analytical solutions of the eigenenergies of a special case of the quantum mechanical three-body problem, namely the (three-dimensional) hydrogen molecule-ion.

Plots

Numerical evaluation

The  function may also be approximated using Halley's method,

given in Corless et al. to compute .

For real , it could be approximated by the quadratic-rate recursive formula of R. Iacono and J.P. Boyd:

Lajos Lóczi proves that by choosing appropriate ,

 if : 
 if  
 if 
 for the principal branch :  
 for the branch :
  for 
  for 

one can determine the maximum number of iteration steps in advance for any precision:

 if  (Theorem 2.4): 
 if  (Theorem 2.9): 
 if 
 for the principal branch  (Theorem 2.17): 
 for the branch (Theorem 2.23):

Software
The Lambert  function is implemented as LambertW in Maple, lambertw in GP (and glambertW in PARI), lambertw in Matlab, also lambertw in Octave with the specfun package, as lambert_w in Maxima, as ProductLog (with a silent alias LambertW) in Mathematica, as lambertw in Python scipy's special function package, as LambertW in Perl's ntheory module, and as gsl_sf_lambert_W0, gsl_sf_lambert_Wm1 functions in the special functions section of the GNU Scientific Library (GSL). In the Boost C++ libraries, the calls are lambert_w0, lambert_wm1, lambert_w0_prime, and lambert_wm1_prime. In R, the Lambert  function is implemented as the lambertW0 and lambertWm1 functions in the lamW package.

C++ code for all the branches of the complex Lambert  function is available on the homepage of István Mező.

See also
 Wright Omega function
 Lambert's trinomial equation
 Lagrange inversion theorem
 Experimental mathematics
 Holstein–Herring method
  model
 Ross'  lemma

Notes

References
 
 
  (Lambert function is used to solve delay-differential dynamics in human disease.)
 
 
 
 Veberic, D., "Having Fun with Lambert W(x) Function" arXiv:1003.1628 (2010);

External links

 National Institute of Science and Technology Digital Library – Lambert 
 MathWorld – Lambert -Function
 Computing the Lambert  function
 Corless et al. Notes about Lambert  research
 GPL C++ implementation with Halley's and Fritsch's iteration.
 Special Functions of the GNU Scientific Library – GSL
 

Special functions